To Whom It May Consume is the first album by the band Rehab and the only one to include all three original members, Denny Campbell (Steaknife), Danny (Boone) Alexander and Jason Brooks (Brooks Buford). The album was recorded and mixed at Entertainment International Studios, Smyrna, GA & Songbird Recording Studios, Atlanta, GA. Originally released in 1999, the album was re-pressed in 2006.

Track listing

Personnel
Danny "Boone" Alexander - Vocals
Jason "Brooks" Buford - Vocals 
Denny Campbell (Steaknife) - Vocals
Brandy Nerud - Backing Vocals
Cathy Swane - Backing Vocals
Jan Nerud - Guitars, Mixing, Engineering
Denman - Percussion, High Hat

References
http://rehab.fourfour.com/discography?id=3961

Rehab (band) albums
1999 debut albums